Bandar-e Emam Khomeyni (also Romanized as Bandare Emam Xomeyni; formerly, Bandar Šâhpur) is a city and capital of Bandar-e Emam Khomeyni District of Mahshahr County, Khuzestan Province, Iran. As of the 2006 census, its population was 67,078, in 14,681 families.

Bandar Imam Khomeini is a port city on the Persian Gulf in  Khūzestān Province, Iran.  Before the 1979 Iranian Revolution, it was known as Bandar Shahpur. It is named after Ayatollah Ruhollah Khomeini.

The city is home to Petrochimi Bandar Imam basketball club, which plays in the Iranian Super League.

Port history

The port is located at the terminus of the Trans-Iranian Railway linking the Persian Gulf with Tehran and on to the Caspian Sea. It is part of same nautical complex as the port of the adjacent city of Bandar-e Mahshahr. Both ports are accessible through the same channel.

During World War II it consisted only of a jetty, two shipping berths, a railhead and warehouses and a civilian settlement some miles distant. The port was initially in German and Italian hands, but was stormed on August 25, 1941, by a combined British and Indian force supported by the Royal Navy.
A flotilla led by the armed merchant cruiser HMS Kanimbla sailed up the waterways and in the raid captured eight Axis vessels, two gunboats and the floating dock. It was at time that, among others, the German ship Hohenfels fell into British hands and became Empire Kamal.

Thereafter it was administered by the US Army 482nd Port Battalion and served as a critical supply point for Allied military aid for Soviet Russia. The port facilities were also used for merchant and military vessel layup and repair. Three additional berths were built during the war.

Port operations

The port of Bandar-e Emam Khomeyni is an Iranian national port operating under the authority of the Iranian Ports and Maritime Organisation. it is the northernmost Iranian port on the Persian Gulf. The Bandar Imam port is a transshipment point for containers, bulk and general cargo, with exclusive access to the facilities held by the Islamic Republic of Iran Shipping Lines (IRISL Group). In 2005, the Iranian government proposed direct container shipments between the port and western Europe, but negotiations with shipping lines for dedicated port facilities and access have not concluded.

A dozen kilometres east of Bandar-e Emam Khomeyni port is the port of Bandar-e Mahshahr which specialises in exporting oil and petrochemical products of the national companies NIOC and NPC. Both ports are accessible through the same 'Khor Musa' channel, which is 42 miles long and about 20 meters deep.

Bandar-e Emam Khomeyni port is connected by rail and road, to the west with Abadan and Khorramshahr and their joint Arvand Free Zone, along the Iran - Iraq border, and to the morth to Ahvaz, Teheran and the Caspian Sea and the Caucasus countries.

The port has seven terminals with 40 berths of about 6,500 metres frontage.

The terminals have warehouses with a capacity of  171,000 m2 and open storage areas covering 10.9 km2.

Transportation

Roads

See also 

 Port of Shahid Rajaee

References

External links
 Iran Ports and Shipping Organization
 Bandar Imam (Imam Khomeini Port) Photo Gallery from the Khuzestan Governorship

Cities in Khuzestan Province
Port cities and towns of the Persian Gulf
Port cities and towns in Iran
Populated places in Mahshahr County